Charles Dixon (born April 14, 1954) is an American comic book writer, best known for his work on the Marvel Comics character the Punisher and on the DC Comics characters Batman, Nightwing, and Robin in the 1990s and early 2000s.

Early life
Dixon was born in West Philadelphia, Pennsylvania, and grew up in Upper Darby, reading comics of all genres. He is a graduate of Upper Darby High School (1972).

Career

1980s
Chuck Dixon's earliest comics work was writing Evangeline for Comico Comics in 1984 and then for First Comics. Editor Larry Hama hired him to write back-up stories for Marvel Comics' Savage Sword of Conan. Writing under the name "Charles Dixon", he would eventually take over the lead feature of Conan on a semi-regular basis. He contributed stories to the Hama edited re-boot of Savage Tales highlighted by a number of western stories illustrated by John Severin.

In 1986, he began working for Eclipse Comics, writing Airboy which was edited by Timothy Truman followed by Cat Yronwode for the bulk of its 50 issue run. Continuing to write for both Marvel and Eclipse on these titles, as well as launching Strike! with artist Tom Lyle in August 1987 and Valkyrie with artist Paul Gulacy in October 1987, he began work on Carl Potts' Alien Legion series for Marvel's Epic Comics imprint, under editor Archie Goodwin. He produced a three-issue adaptation of J. R. R. Tolkien's The Hobbit for Eclipse with artist David Wenzel between 1989 and 1990, and began writing Marc Spector: Moon Knight in June 1989 for editor Potts.

1990s (Punisher and Batman)
The Punisher Kingdom Gone graphic novel (August 1990) led to him working on the monthly The Punisher War Journal and later other Punisher titles, and brought him to the attention of DC Comics editor Dennis O'Neil, who asked him and Tom Lyle to produce a Robin mini-series featuring the Tim Drake incarnation. The series proved popular enough to spawn two sequels – The Joker's Wild (1991) and Cry of the Huntress (1992). This led to both an ongoing monthly series which Dixon wrote for 100 issues before leaving to work with CrossGen Comics, and to Dixon working on Detective Comics from #644 (May 1992) to #738 (Nov. 1999) through the major Batman stories "Knightfall'" and "KnightsEnd" for which he helped create the key character of Bane, "Contagion", "Legacy", "Cataclysm", and "No Man's Land". Dixon and Lyle co-created the Electrocutioner in Detective Comics #644 (May 1992) and Stephanie Brown in Detective Comics #647 (August 1992). Much of his later run was illustrated by Graham Nolan.

He was DC's most prolific Batman writer in the 1990s. In addition to writing Detective Comics he pioneered the individual series for Robin, Nightwing (which he wrote for 70 issues, and returned to briefly with 2005's #101) and Batgirl, as well as creating the team and book Birds of Prey.

While writing multiple Punisher and Batman comics and October 1994's Punisher/Batman crossover, he launched Team 7 for Jim Lee's WildStorm/Image and Prophet for Rob Liefeld's Extreme Studios. He wrote many issues of Catwoman and Green Arrow, regularly having about seven titles out each month between 1993 and 1998. In 1994, Dixon co-wrote the Batman-Spawn: War Devil intercompany crossover with Doug Moench and Alan Grant. Dixon and Tom Grummett crafted a Secret Six one-shot (Dec. 1997) as part of the Tangent Comics imprint.

2000s

CrossGen
In March 2002, Dixon turned his attention to CrossGen's output, slowly leaving Robin, Nightwing, Birds of Prey and Batgirl over the next year although he co-wrote with Scott Beatty the origin of Barbara Gordon's Batgirl in 2003's Batgirl: Year One. For CrossGen he took over some of the comics of the departing Mark Waid, taking over Sigil from #21, and Crux with #13. He launched Way of the Rat in June 2002, Brath (March 2003), The Silken Ghost (June 2003) and the pirate comic El Cazador (Oct 2003), as well as editing Robert Rodi's non-Sigilverse The Crossovers. He wrote the Ruse spin-off Archard's Agents one-shots in January and November 2003 and April 2004, the last released shortly before CrossGen's cancellation of all of its series. Dixon wrote a single issue of Sojourn (May 2004). Dixon's Way of the Rat #24, Brath #14 and El Cazador #6 were among the last comics released from the then-bankrupt publisher.

Other publishers
In mid-2004, Dixon wrote a number of issues and series' for smaller publishers Devil's Due Publishing and Moonstone Books. During this period, he returned briefly to DC but mostly worked on comics at several publishers, including several issues of Simpsons Comics for Bongo Comics, for whom he has worked quite regularly from September 1998 to the present, and a couple of projects with Image Comics. In May 2006, Dixon contributed to IDW Publishing's Free Comic Book Day Transformers giveaway, leading to him writing the Transformers: Evolutions miniseries.

Return to DC
In July 2004, Dixon began his return to the DC Universe with Richard Dragon, a revival of the 1970s kung-fu character, which ran for 12 issues. In March of the following year, he returned briefly to Nightwing before shifting his efforts to the Wildstorm imprint, writing the stand-alone Claw the Unconquered (Aug 2006 – Jan 2007); the movie-adaptation of Snakes on a Plane, the movie-spin-off Nightmare on Elm Street, and the Wildstorm Universe title Grifter/Midnighter from May 2007.

In January 2007, he wrote the Connor Hawke: Dragon's Blood mini-series featuring Green Arrow's son Connor Hawke, and in March 2008, Dixon returned to writing Robin. He wrote Batman and the Outsiders, a project he was signed to at the last minute, after original writer Tony Bedard dropped out due to being occupied with Final Crisis-related work. On June 10, 2008, Dixon announced on his forum that he was no longer "employed by DC Comics in any capacity." He nonetheless did occasional work for DC after this, including 2017's Bane: Conquest limited series, and a special issue for Robin's 80th anniversary.

After DC
It was announced in August 2008 that he would write Dynamite Entertainment's series The Man with No Name based on the Western character. He wrote a G.I. Joe series for IDW Publishing. In March 2009 Moonstone Books published a new Airboy one-shot written by Dixon entitled Airboy 1942: The Best of Enemies. In 2011, Dixon says he was offered a chance to do a rewrite on The Expendables 2 screenplay by Sylvester Stallone, but declined.

2010s
In the late 2010s, he went to work for Vox Day's Arkhaven Comics, writing for their Alt-Hero Universe on titles such as Alt-Hero: Q and Chuck Dixon's Avalon.

In 2017 and 2018, Dixon wrote Zenescope's Van Helsing vs. The Werewolf and Robyn Hood: The Curse.

In 2021 he started the Levon Cade series from Rough Edges Press.  At present there are almost a dozen novels in the series.

Awards
Chuck Dixon received an Inkpot Award in 2014.

Bibliography

Across the Pond Studios
 Iron Ghost #1–6 (2007)

Antarctic Press
 Airboy: Deadeye #1–5 (2012) with Gianluca Piredda and Ben Dunn

Arkhaven Comics
 Alt*Hero: Q #1–2
 Chuck Dixon's Avalon #1–6

Bongo Comics
 Simpsons Comics #42, 50, 65, 77, 92, 96, 99, 108, 115–116, 125, 131–133, 137, 140, 142–145, 147, 151, 153, 158–159, 164, 169, 173, 176–177, 181, 192, 195, 199, 205 (1999–2013)
 Simpsons Comics Presents Bart Simpson #8, 25, 34, 41 (2002–2008)
 The Simpsons Winter Wingding #2, 4 (2007–2009)
 Treehouse of Horror #4 (1998)

CrossGen Comics
 Archard's Agents #1–3 (2003–2004)
 Brath #1–14 (2003–2004)
 Crux #13–33 (2002–2004)
 El Cazador #1–6 (2003–2004)
 Sigil #21–42 (2002–2003)
 The Silken Ghost #1–5 (2003)
 Way of the Rat #2–24 (2002–2004)

Dark Horse Comics
 Dark Horse Comics #10–12 (1993)
 Star Wars: General Grievous #1–4 (2005)
 Superman/Tarzan: Sons of the Jungle #1–3 (2001–2002)

DC Comics
 Action Comics #771 (2000)
 Adventure Comics 80-Page Giant #1 (1998)
 Bane: Conquest #1–12 (2017–2018)
 Batgirl #12, 20, 30–32 (2001–2002)
 Batgirl: Year One #1–9 (2003)
 Batman #467–469, 560–562, 571, Annual #23 (1991–1999)
 Batman and The Outsiders vol. 2, #1–10 (2007–2008)
 Batman: Bane of the Demon #1–4 (1998)
 Batman Black and White #2 (1996)
 The Batman Chronicles #1–4, 9, 11–12 (1995–2000)
 Batman 80-Page Giant #1, 3 (1998–2000)
 Batman: GCPD #1–4 (1996)
 Batman: Gordon's Law #1–4 (1996–1997)
 Batman: Gotham Adventures #29 (2000)
 Batman: Gotham City Secret Files #1 (2000)
 Batman: Gotham Knights #19 (2001)
 Batman: Legends of the Dark Knight #55–57, 62, 124, 142–145, Annual #5 (1993–2001)
 Batman: No Man's Land Secret Files #1 (1999)
 Batman Secret Files #1 (1997)
 Batman-Spawn: War Devil #1 (1994)
 Batman: The Ankh #1–2 (2001)
 Batman: The Chalice #1 (1999)
 Batman: Vengeance of Bane Special #1 (1993)
 Batman Villains Secret Files #1 (1998)
 Batman/Wildcat #1–3 (1997)
 Birds of Prey #1–46 (1999–2002)
 Booster Gold vol. 2, #11–12 (2008)
 Catwoman vol. 2, #12, 15–21, 25, 27–37(1994–1996)
 Catwoman/Wildcat #1–4 (1998)
 Claw the Unconquered vol. 2 #1–3, 5–6 (2006–2007)
 Conjurors #1–3 (1999)
 Connor Hawke: Dragon's Blood #1–6 (2007)
 DCU Holiday Bash #2–3 (1998–1999)
 DCU Villains Secret Files #1 (1999)
 Detective Comics #0, 644–729, 738, 1,000,000, Annual #6–10 (1992–1999)
 Green Arrow vol. 2, #83, 93–137, 1,000,000, Annual #7 (1994–1998)
 Guy Gardner #11–16 (1993–1994)
 Huntress vol. 2 #1–4 (1994)
 The Joker: Last Laugh #1–6, Secret Files #1 (2001–2002)
 Justice Riders #1 (1997)
 Man-Bat vol. 2, #1–3 (1996)
 Nightwing vol. 2, #1–70, 101–106, 1,000,000, 1/2 (1996–2005)
 Nightwing 80-Page Giant #1 (2000)
 Nightwing Secret Files #1 (1999)
 Richard Dragon #1–12 (2004–2005)
 Robin #1–5 (1991)
 Robin vol. 2, #1–100, 170–174, 1,000,000, Annual #2–6 (1993–2008)
 Robin II #1–4 (1991)
 Robin III: Cry of the Huntress #1–6 (1992–1993)
 Robin: Year One #1–4 (2000–2001)
 Rush City #1–6 (2006–2007)
 Secret Origins 80-Page Giant #1 (1998)
 Superboy/Robin: World's Finest Three #1–2 (1996)
 Superman: The Odyssey #1 (1999)
 Tangent Comics/Secret Six #1 (1997)

DC Comics/Dark Horse Comics
 Batman Versus Predator III: Blood Ties #1–4 (1997–1998)
 Superman/Aliens 2: God War #1–4 (2002)

Wildstorm Productions
 Grifter/Midnighter #3–4 (2007)
 A Nightmare on Elm Street #1–8 (2006–2007)
 Snakes on a Plane #1–2 (2006)
 Storming Paradise #1–6 (2008–2009)
 Team 7 #1–4 (1994–1995)
 Team 7 – Dead Reckoning #1–4 (1996)
 Team Zero #1–6 (2006)

Devil's Due
 G.I. Joe: Reloaded #10–14 (2004–2005)

Eclipse Comics
 Airboy #1–50 (1986–1989)
 Airboy Meets the Prowler #1 (1987)
 Airboy versus the Airmaidens #1 (1988)
 The Airfighters Meet Sgt. Strike Special #1 (1988)
 Airmaidens Special #1 (1987)
 Alien Encounters #11, 13–14 (1987)
 The Black Terror #1–3 (1989–1990)
 The Hobbit #1–3 (1989–1990)
 Radio Boy #1 (1987)
 Skywolf #1–3 (1988)
 Strike! #1–6 (1987–1988)
 Swords of Texas #1–4 (1987–1988)
 Tales of Terror #5–13 (1986–1987)
 Valkyrie #1–3 (1987)
 Valkyrie vol. 2 #1–3 (1988)
 Winterworld #1–3 (1987–1988)

Fanatic Comics
 Ravage: Kill all men! #1 (2020-present), writer (with Benjamin L. Henderson)

First Comics
 Evangeline #1–12 (1987–1989)

IDW Publishing
 G. I. Joe #0, 1–27 (2008–2011)
 G. I. Joe vol. 2 #1–5 (2011)
 G. I. Joe Season 2 #6–21 (2011–2013)
 G.I. Joe: Origins #6–7, 16–18 (2009–2010)
 G.I. Joe: Snake Eyes #1–7 (2011)
 G.I. Joe: Special Missions #1–14 (2013–2014)
 Snake Eyes #8–12 (2011–2012)
 Snake Eyes and Storm Shadow #13–21 (2012–2013)
 Winterworld #0–7 (2014–2015)
 Winterworld-Frozen Fleet #1–3 (2015)

Marvel Comics
 Code of Honor #1–4 (1997)
 Conan The Savage #1–4, 7, 9 (1995–1996)
 Conan The Usurper
 Doom #1–3 (2000)
 Doom: The Emperor Returns #1–3 (2002)
 Hawkeye vol. 2 #1–4 (1994)
 Marc Spector: Moon Knight #1–24, 34 (1989–1992)
 Marvel Comics Presents #152–154 (1994)
 Marvel Knights #1–15 (2000–2001)
 The 'Nam #43, 46, 48, 54–69 (1990–1992)
 The Punisher #45, 49, 63, 89–93, 97–104, Annual #6 (1991–1995)
 The Punisher: Kingdom Gone graphic novel #1 (1990)
 The Punisher War Journal #38–42, 44–64, 75–80 (1992–1995)
 The Punisher War Zone #1–11, 26–37, 41, Annual #1–2 (1992–1995)
 Savage Sword of Conan #119–122, 124–142, 144–156, 158–159, 161–165, 170, 172, 176–179, 183, 186, 213 (1985–1993)
 Savage Tales vol. 2 #3–8 (1986)
 War Man #1–2 (1993)
 What If...? vol. 2 #57–58, 67–68, 70, 78 (1994–1995)
 What The--?! #5 (1989)

Epic Comics
 Alien Legion vol. 2 #1–18 (1987–1990)
 Alien Legion: Binary Deep #1 (1993)
 Alien Legion: Jugger Grimrod #1 (1992)
 Alien Legion: On the Edge #1–3 (1990–1991)
 Alien Legion: One Planet at a Time #1–3 (1993)
 Car Warriors #1–4 (1991)
 Lawdog #1–7 (1993)

Marvel Comics/DC Comics
 Bruce Wayne: Agent of S.H.I.E.L.D. #1 (1996)

Moonstone Books
 Airboy 1942: Best of Enemies #1 (2009)
 The Phantom #9–10, Annual #1 (2006–2007)

Regnery Publishing
 Clinton Cash: A Graphic Novel (2016)

Tor Books
 Robert Jordan's The Wheel of Time: The Eye of the World (comic book adaptation)

Zenescope Entertainment
 Van Helsing vs The Werewolf vol. 1 #1–6 (2017)
 Robyn Hood: The Curse #1–6 (2018)
 Van Helsing: Sword of Heaven #1-6 (2019)
 Robyn Hood: Justice #1-6 (2020)

References

External links

 
 
 
 Interview w/ "Chuck Dixon" om Super Hero Speak.
 Scripts & Scribes Interview with Chuck Dixon

1954 births
American comics writers
American graphic novelists
American male novelists
Inkpot Award winners
Living people
Marvel Comics writers
Writers from Philadelphia